Fritton may refer to the following places in Norfolk, England:

 Fritton, Great Yarmouth
 Fritton, North Norfolk, a location near Ludham
 Fritton (near Morning Thorpe), South Norfolk